Vyazovka is a rural locality (a selo) in Sinyavskoye Rural Settlement, Talovsky District, Voronezh Oblast, Russia. The population was 469 as of 2010. There are 4 streets.

Geography 
Vyazovka is located 39 km northeast of Talovaya (the district's administrative centre) by road. Babinka is the nearest rural locality.

References 

Rural localities in Talovsky District